The ice hockey team rosters at the 1952 Winter Olympics consisted of the following players:

Canada
Head coach: Louis Holmes

Czechoslovakia
Head coach: Jiří Tožička 

Assistant coach: Josef Herman

Finland
Head coach: Risto Lindroos 

Assistant coach:  Viljo Wirkkunen

Germany
Head coach:  Joe Aitken

Norway
Head coach:  Bud McEachern

Poland
Head coach: Mieczysław Kasprzycki

Sweden

Switzerland
Head coach: Bibi Torriani

United States
Head coach: Connie Pleban

References

Sources

Hockey Hall Of Fame page on the 1952 Olympics

rosters
1952